Halol is one of the 182 Legislative Assembly constituencies of Gujarat state in India. It is part of Panchmahal district.

List of segments
This assembly seat represents the following segments:This assembly seat represents the following segments,

 Halol Taluka
 Jambughoda Taluka
 Ghoghamba Taluka (Part) Villages – Paroli, Vel Kotar, Kanbipalli, Boriya, Gamirpura, Math, Kumbhar Palli, Jagana Muvada, Lalpari, Farod, Valinath, Kharkhadi, Bhanpura, Ghoghamba, Goth, Rajgadh, Palla, Adepur, Zoz, Mol, Shamalkuva, Padhora, Savapura, Rayan Muvada, Jitpura, Nathkuva, Kankodakui, Chandra Nagar, Dudhapura, Dhaneshwar, Udva, Garmotiya, Labadadhara, Zinzari, Virapura, Ranjitnagar, Rinchhiya, Chelavada, Tadkundla, Kalsar, Zab (Vav), Vav, Vankod, Bakrol, Nathpura, Sarasava, Poyali.

Member of Legislative Assembly
2002 - Jaydrathsinh Parmar, Bharatiya Janata Party
2007 - Jaydrathsinh Parmar, Bharatiya Janata Party
2012 - Jaydrathsinh Parmar, Bharatiya Janata Party

Election results

2022

2017

2012

2007

2002

See also
 List of constituencies of Gujarat Legislative Assembly
 Gujarat Legislative Assembly
 Panchmahal district

References

Assembly constituencies of Gujarat
Panchmahal district